Breuil may refer to the following:

People
 Beta Breuil (1876 – after 1918), American script editor and screenwriter
 Henri Breuil (1877–1961), French archeologist and ethnographer 
 Alphonse du Breuil (1811–1885), French botanist
 Christophe Breuil (born 1968), French mathematician

Places

France
Breuil, Somme, in the Somme département 
Breuil-Barret, in the Vendée département 
Breuil-Bois-Robert, in the Yvelines département 
Breuil-la-Réorte, in the Charente-Maritime département 
Breuil-le-Sec, in the Oise département 
Breuil-le-Vert, in the Oise département 
Breuil-Magné, in the Charente-Maritime département 
Breuil-sur-Vesle, in the Marne département

Italy
Breuil-Cervinia, in the Aosta Valley

See also
 Breuilh, a former commune in the Dordogne department in southwestern France
 Breil (disambiguation)
 Le Breuil (disambiguation)